Crusader is the name of different fictional characters appearing in American comic books published by Marvel Comics. Two have made significant appearances and other are minor characters or aliases.

The first Crusader first appeared in Thor  #330 (April, 1983) and was created by writer Alan Zelenetz and penciller Bob Hall.

The second is a Skrull superhero that first appeared in Marvel Team-Up vol. 3 #23 (Aug. 2006) and was created by Robert Kirkman and Andy Kuhn.

Fictional character biography

Arthur Blackwood

Arthur Blackwood was born in Decatur, Illinois. He was a seminary student in Chicago, who believed that the church should become more active in fighting paganism and godlessness in modern society. Dismissed from the seminary for getting into an altercation with a disagreeing superior, Blackwood visited his family crypt to meditate on his life. There, he had a religious vision of all of his ancestors who devoted their lives to serving God. In this vision, he met the spirit of one of his ancestors who served in the Crusades. This spirit seemingly bequeathed to him the combined power of all his ancestors and dubbed him knight. When Blackwood awoke from this vision, he discovered that a sword, shield, and knight's raiment had inexplicably materialized nearby. Blackwood decided to take up the sword and use his newfound power to destroy all pagans and infidels. As his first target, he chose the thunder god Thor, whose claims of godhood seemed blasphemous to him. Calling himself the Crusader, Blackwood attacked Thor at a public assembly. Somehow the strength of his faith granted him sufficient power not only to hold his own in pitched battle with the Asgardian, but also to inflict upon Thor a seemingly mortal wound. When Thor reappeared a short time later, his wound fully healed by the power of Odin, the Crusader's belief in his own infallibility was shaken. The Crusader was unable to comprehend how a supposed agent of the devil like Thor could be superior to him, a self-styled messenger of the Lord. When Thor shattered his sword, the Crusader fled, filled with doubts about the righteousness of his cause.

Blackwood re-forged the sword and went back into action. He killed two church thieves, and attacked the Emir of Ghulistan. He then battled the Black Knight, but was forced to surrender and his sword and shield were shattered.

Blackwood's doubt has often caused him to lose battles rather than win them. Luke Cage was also able to defeat Blackwood after breaking his sword, once again causing Blackwood to doubt his cause leading, in turn, to yet another defeat. His doubt also led him to defeat at the hands of Nate Grey. After this, Blackwood seemingly disappeared from continuing his crusade.

Not too long after the Avengers were broken up, Electro conducted the breakout of many famous Marvel villains from The Raft, a prison island for super villains. Blackwood was held as a prisoner there but would soon escape along with many other prisoners. This escape once again inspired Blackwood to continue his crusade, starting with Doctor Strange. However, his newest crusade would also be his last as Strange would use his powers to send Blackwood back to the Raft.

During the "Civil War" storyline, it is revealed that the Crusader is still active and had organized a religious group of thugs for himself. After hijacking a plane filled with money and planning to bomb the headquarters of several super-heroes, the Crusader and his men are stopped by Wolverine after he hears about their operation. In the process, Wolverine gouges out the Crusader's right eye, while quoting the Bible with "An eye for an eye". However, Wolverine is unable to prevent the plane from crashing down into a cornfield. On impact, the plane suddenly explodes, with both Wolverine and Blackwood surviving the crash.

The Crusader attended a meeting organized by the Hood to take advantage of the split in the superhero community caused by the Superhuman Registration Act. According to his entry in volume 3 of The Official Handbook of the Marvel Universe A-Z, he did not accept Hood's invitation.

Powers and abilities
Arthur Blackwood gained superhuman powers after experiencing a religious vision in which he was seemingly bequeathed the combined power of his ancestors who had served God. The Crusader's physical attributes, as well as the power of his sword and shield, are directly related to his will and belief. While he is confident, his strength, speed, stamina, agility, dexterity, reflexes/reactions and resistance to injury are sufficient for him to stand toe-to-toe with the likes of Thor. However, if his faith wavers, his superhuman powers will rapidly disappear. Upon transforming into the Crusader, he instantly summons his mystical body armor, sword, and shield. These items are strong enough to withstand repeated blows by Thor's hammer before shattering. As the Crusader, he is a master swordsman and jouster. Blackwood has earned a master's degree, though his studies towards Doctorate of Divinity remain uncompleted.

Z'Reg

Z'Reg is a Skrull operative who was sent to spy on the Avengers after his training. However, he arrives on Earth shortly after the Avengers disbanded. Falling in love with the planet's customs and superheroes under the civilian identity of Aubrey Thompson, Z'Reg decides to become a superhero and calls himself the Crusader (a name he chose specifically because it gives no clue as to his abilities).

He soon became the mentor of Freedom Ring. After Freedom Ring is killed by Iron Maniac, Crusader takes the boy's reality-altering ring for himself as a way to honor his fallen comrade. Rather than using the ring to continue his superhero career, Crusader seems to have retired to a life of leisure using it to create fake Skrull women. When Titannus attacked the US, Crusader helped other superheroes to defeat the monster.

Crusader is later seen on board a bus of new recruits arriving at Camp Hammond to join the Fifty State Initiative, along with Ant-Man, Melee, Geldoff, Dragon Lord, Geiger, Red Nine, and Diamondback. The clone of MVP known as "KIA" attacked Crusader and the other new trainees, and severed Crusader's hand in the battle. His hand was surgically reattached by the Camp's doctor, Physique. Fearing a medical examination would reveal his true form, Crusader used the fragments of the Cosmic Cube in his ring to make himself appear human to the doctor's medical tests (in fact, an overly average human, so much so that the doctor comments on how generic his readings are).

During the Secret Invasion storyline, Crusader suspects that camp director Yellowjacket is actually a Skrull impostor named Criti Noll. It turns out they both enjoyed the taste of pickles and strawberries which tastes like a Skrull delicacy. He almost tells the camp's counselor Trauma, but changes his mind. When 3-D Man arrives in Camp Hammond to announce to everyone assembled that the Initiative has been infiltrated by Skrulls, Crusader fears that he will be exposed as a Skrull despite his good intentions. Crusader uses the ring to reverse the goggles' power so that they cause 3-D Man to see Crusader as human and all humans as Skrulls. Realizing the ramifications of this act, Crusader manages to get Delroy to move out of the ring's range, nullifying the effect. Crusader joins the rest of the Initiative in combating the Skrull invasion of New York. Crusader kills his old friend K'rtem who had given him a scar down his face during Skrull training, which Crusader has worn as a proud reminder. After killing K'rtem, Crusader removes the scar from his form. Crusader witnesses Initiative cadet Proton being executed by the Skrulls. After some doubt to which side he should fight for (and a personal pep talk by Nick Fury), Crusader decides to fight for Earth. After the battle, Crusader notices the Skrull impersonating Pym running off and chases after him. Crusader fights and defeats the impostor, but 3-D Man then realizes that Crusader is a Skrull and shoots him through the head. His fellow Initiative members believe that "human" Crusader had simply been replaced by a Skrull. As Crusader lays mortally injured, he wishes "it could have ended differently" and then disappears.

Powers and abilities
Z'Reg's Skrull physiology enables him to shapeshift into virtually any form that he chooses and copy the powers of other heroes. Later, he takes Curtis Doyle's ring as an honor for his death. The ring was crafted from a fragment of a destroyed Cosmic Cube which allows the wearer to alter reality within a radius of roughly 15 feet (4.6m) around him, giving him a  sphere of reality he can alter.

Other characters named Crusader
 In Black Knight Comics #1-5, el Alemain was known as Crusader circa 1189 A.D.  He was an Englishman and an ally of King Richard. He wore a robe and headdress and used a scimitar.
 An impostor Marvel Boy (Robert Grayson) was called Crusader in Fantastic Four #165.
 On Earth-238, Perseus Ablemarle is known as Crusader. He sought vengeance on the criminals that killed his parents and was possibly killed on his first outing. He was trained in various forms of combat and first appeared in Rampage Magazine #41 and died in Marvel Super-Heroes #388.
 On Earth-9811, Sarah Rogers, the daughter of Captain America and Rogue, was known as Crusader. She first appeared in What If? vol. 2 #114 and Avengers Forever #11-12.
 In the Ultraverse (non-Marvel comics), an immortal warrior was called Crusader but was defeated by Rune in 1348 A.D. and later killed by Rune.  He first appeared in Rune vol. 2 #4.
 On Earth-2122, a member of the Captain Britain Corps was called Crusader X. He was one of the sole survivors of Mastermind's slaughter of the Corps and assisted Excalibur in his defeat. He first appeared in Excalibur #21.

References

External links
 
 Crusader (Z'Reg) at Marvel.com
 Crusader (Arthur Blackwood) at Marvel Wiki
 Crusader (Z'Reg) at Marvel Wiki
 
 

Characters created by Robert Kirkman
Comics characters introduced in 1983
Comics characters introduced in 2006
Fictional characters from Chicago
Fictional characters from Illinois
Fictional swordfighters in comics
Marvel Comics characters who are shapeshifters
Marvel Comics extraterrestrial superheroes
Marvel Comics male superheroes
Marvel Comics supervillains
Skrull